Juraichhari is an upazila of Rangamati District in the Division of Chittagong, Bangladesh.

Geography
It has 2412 households and total area 606.05 km2.

Demographics
As of the 1991 Bangladesh census, Juraichhari has a population of 11621. Males constitute 52.16% of the population, and females 47.84%. This Upazila's eighteen up population is 6158. Juraichhari has an average literacy rate of 23.4% (7+ years), and the national average of 32.4% literate.

Administration
Juraichhari Upazila is divided into four union parishads: Banjugichhara, Dumdumya, Juraichhari, and Maidang. The union parishads are subdivided into 11 mauzas and 105 villages.

See also
 Upazilas of Bangladesh
 Districts of Bangladesh
 Divisions of Bangladesh

References

Upazilas of Rangamati Hill District